The 1964 Belgian Grand Prix was a Formula One motor race held at Spa-Francorchamps on 14 June 1964. It was race 3 of 10 in both the 1964 World Championship of Drivers and the 1964 International Cup for Formula One Manufacturers.

Jim Clark gained a surprise victory, due to Dan Gurney running out of fuel while leading most of the race, Graham Hill retiring while leading on the last two laps, and had also just managed to hold off Bruce McLaren at the flag. This was also Clark's third consecutive victory in Belgium. Peter Revson was disqualified because he received a push start after his engine cut out.

Classification

Qualifying

Race

Championship standings after the race 

Drivers' Championship standings

Constructors' Championship standings

 Notes: Only the top five positions are included for both sets of standings.
Only the best 6 results counted toward the championship so Graham Hill's 5th place finish was eventually left out.

References

External links 
 1964 Belgian Grand Prix at StatsF1

Belgian Grand Prix
Belgian Grand Prix
Grand Prix
June 1964 sports events in Europe